The 14th Street/Eighth Avenue station is an underground New York City Subway station complex shared by the IND Eighth Avenue Line and the BMT Canarsie Line. It is located at Eighth Avenue and 14th Street in Manhattan, and served by the A, E, and L trains at all times and the C train at all times except late nights.

The whole complex is ADA-compliant, with the accessible station entrance at 14th Street. This complex was renovated at the beginning of the 21st century. There are several MTA New York City Transit Authority training facilities located in the mezzanine. The station complex contains an artwork by Tom Otterness called Life Underground, which features whimsical bronze sculptures, including a sewer alligator, scattered about the station.

History 
The Eighth Avenue station of the Brooklyn–Manhattan Transit Corporation (BMT)'s Canarsie Line opened on May 30, 1931, and was the last station to open on the Canarsie Line, built as an extension from the mainline that opened seven years earlier westward from Sixth Avenue, the previous terminal. The 14th Street station opened on September 10, 1932, as part of the city-operated Independent Subway System (IND)'s initial segment, the Eighth Avenue Line between Chambers Street and 207th Street.

In 1999, this station underwent a major station renovation. On August 24, 1993, the contract for the project's design was awarded for $994,079. In May 1994, a supplemental agreement worth $203,435 was reached to allow the consultant to design the New York City Transit training facility to be compliant with the Americans with Disabilities Act of 1990. As part of the project's design, multiple options were considered to improve the station, including the construction of a free transfer zone between the Eighth Avenue and Canarsie Lines. As part of the supplemental agreement, the consultant was directed to design it.

On April 18, 2004, an L train collided with the bumper block after the operator suffered a possible seizure.

On September 20, 2020, a northbound A train derailed at the IND station when a homeless man clamped wooden planks onto the roadbed causing the train to derail. Three passengers were injured.

Station layout

The artwork in this station is by Tom Otterness, called Life Underground, and was installed in 2001. It features whimsical bronze sculptures, including a sewer alligator, scattered about the station. From 1989 to 1995, an artwork by Ross Lewis could be found in the station. It is called Parallel Motion, and it shows images of moving bodies in the mezzanine drawn by brushstrokes using Chinese calligraphy. It is now situated in the lobby of Public School 89 in Battery Park City.

Exits
The entrances of the station complex are located at the intersections of Eighth Avenue and 14th, 15th, and 16th Streets. The northernmost one has an unstaffed bank of turnstiles, two staircases going up to the northwest corner of 16th Street and Eighth Avenue, and one going up to each eastern side of the intersection. A passageway leads to the front entrance of 111 Eighth Avenue (the Port Authority of New York and New Jersey building now occupied by Google) at the southwest corner. A sign on the sidewalk outside the building indicates that an entrance to the station is available inside of the building. On either side, at the center of the mezzanine, a set of full height turnstiles lead to a staircases going up to either northern corners of 15th Street and Eighth Avenue.

The full-time fare control area is at the south end of the mezzanine. On the east side is the transfer passageway between the platforms containing a ramp, staircase, and elevator. A set of full height turnstiles leads to a staircase going up to the northeast corner of 14th Street and 8th Avenue. The full-time turnstile bank has a token booth, two staircases to either southern corners of the intersection, and one staircase and elevator going up to the northwest corner. There is a direct entrance/exit to the BMT platforms at one bank of turnstiles here. This area also provides access to a signal training school for New York City Transit employees.

There was a fourth set of entrances located at the intersection of Eighth Avenue and 17th Street which have since been closed.

IND Eighth Avenue Line platforms 

The 14th Street station is an express station on the IND Eighth Avenue Line that has four tracks and two island platforms. It is the southernmost Eighth Avenue Line station that is under Eighth Avenue itself. South of here, the line curves east to Sixth Avenue via Greenwich Avenue.

During daytime hours, C and E trains stop on the outer, local tracks, while A trains stop on the center, express tracks. During late-night hours, all service is on the local tracks. Both outer track walls have a medium yellow-orange trim line with a terracotta brown border. It's set in a two-high course, a pattern usually reserved for local stations. "14th" is written in black on the white tiles below the trim line. Both platforms have yellow I-beam-columns running along the center of the platform. The original 1931 trim line was a three tiles high deep yellow-orange set without a border. There are many staircases and one elevator per platform leading up to the full-length mezzanine above, which has a trim line, name tablets, and columns that are held in the same style as the platform below.

BMT Canarsie Line platform 

The Eighth Avenue station is the western (railroad north) terminal of the BMT Canarsie Line that has two tracks and one island platform. The station is served by the L train at all times.

Eighth Avenue uses a single island platform with two tracks which are designated officially as Q1 and Q2. Originally, they were named QW1 and QW2 since Eighth Avenue was a western extension of the Canarsie Line, but the line has been re-chained as Q. Eighth Avenue is the zero-point of the Canarsie Line's chaining, that is, it is the starting point of all distances on the line. The tracks end at bumper blocks just past the west end of the platform.

The station was originally decorated in a more IND style than the rest of the Canarsie Line, which was built by the BMT. The original tile band was a two-tone ultramarine blue with "8th Av" captions. However, a 1999 renovation subsequently removed the IND style and replaced it with the BMT quilt-like tile pattern that exists on all other subway stations on the BMT Canarsie Line. The current tile color scheme is white with red stripes and mosaics held in beige and tan, with a pattern of red, yellow, green and off-white in the center. To signify the station's location, there are small "8" decorations set in teal-green hexagons, as found in other stations on the line.

Nearby points of interest 

 Abingdon Square
 Chelsea art galleries west of 10th Avenue
 Chelsea Market
 Chelsea Piers Sports Complex
 The High Line
 Hudson River Park
 IAC Building
 Jackson Square Park
 Meatpacking District
 Saint Vincent's Hospital; fence nearby is covered with ceramic tiles in tribute to the World Trade Center
 Westbeth Artists Community
 West Village
 Whitney Museum of American Art

References

External links 

 
 
 14th Street entrance from Google Maps Street View
 15th Street entrance from Google Maps Street View
 16th Street entrance from Google Maps Street View
 BMT Canarsie Line platform seen from a train from Google Maps Street View
 BMT Canarsie Line platform from Google Maps Street View
 IND Eighth Avenue Line platforms from Google Maps Street View

BMT Canarsie Line stations
IND Eighth Avenue Line stations
Eighth Avenue (Manhattan)
New York City Subway transfer stations
New York City Subway stations in Manhattan
New York City Subway terminals
Railway stations in the United States opened in 1931
Chelsea, Manhattan
West Village
1931 establishments in New York City
14th Street (Manhattan)